W. T. Simmons was a member of the Texas House from 1870 to 1873.

Life

Early Years (Unknown-1870)
The only thing that most likely happened before he served in the Texas House was that he served in the Civil War.

Politics (1870-1873)
He served in the Texas House from February 1870 to January 1873.

Committees he served in

1870
Member of the House Committee on Division of the State, Select
Member of the House Committee on Education
Member of the House Committee on House Officer and Employee Compensation, Select
Member of the House Committee on Penitentiary

1871
Member of the House Committee on Commerce and Manufactures
Member of the House Committee on Public Buildings and Grounds
Member of the House Committee on Regulate Pay of House Employees
Member of the House Committee on Penitentiary

Later Years (1873-Unknown)
Not much is known, but he for sure died sometime after he was in the House.

References

Texas House of Representatives
19th-century American politicians
Year of birth missing
Year of death missing
Date of birth unknown
Date of death unknown